The Croatia men's national under-20 basketball team is a national basketball team of Croatia, administered by the Croatian Basketball Federation. It represents the country in international men's under-20 basketball competitions.

FIBA U20 European Championship participations

FIBA Under-21 World Championship participations

See also
Croatia men's national basketball team
Croatia men's national under-18 and under-19 basketball team
Croatia women's national under-20 basketball team

References

External links
Archived records of Croatia team participations

Basketball in Croatia
Croatia men's national basketball team
National sports teams of Croatia
Men's national under-20 basketball teams